Anaganaga Oka Roju is a 1996 Indian Telugu-language comedy film written and directed by Ram Gopal Varma. The  film stars J. D. Chakravarthy and Urmila Matondkar in lead roles. Raghuvaran, Brahmanandam and Kota Srinivasa Rao play other pivotal roles.

The film was opened to positive reviews by critics, and was a box office hit. Brahmanandam has garnered the state Nandi Award for best comedian. The film was dubbed in Tamil as Andru Oru Naal.

Plot
Chakri (J.D. Chakravarthy) and Madhu (Urmila Matondkar) are neighbours who love each other. Their parents, who fight each other all the time over petty issues, do not approve them of their love. They run away from the house.

The film involves the comic travails of a couple eloping and on the run from their parents. They get entangled as murder suspects of a politician. In a police and political mafia road hunt for an incriminating audio tape.

Cast

Soundtrack
The music was composed by Sri Kommineni and released by Varma Audio. All lyrics were penned by Sirivennela Seetharama Sastry.

Awards
Nandi Awards
 Best Male Comedian - Brahmanandam

DVD
KAD Entertainment purchased the home video rights for this movie.

References

External links
 

1997 films
1990s road movies
Indian road movies
Indian action thriller films
Indian chase films
Indian drama road movies
1997 action thriller films
Films about organised crime in India
Films directed by Ram Gopal Varma
1990s Telugu-language films
Telugu films remade in other languages